The Coulonge River is a predominantly wilderness river in western Quebec, Canada.

A popular river for whitewater canoeing enthusiasts, it is often grouped together with the Dumoine and Noire Rivers as three of a kind. The three rivers share the same watershed, and have similar whitewater characteristics.

The historic Félix-Gabriel-Marchand Bridge crosses the Coulonge River near Fort-Coulonge.

History
The Coulonge River is named after Nicholas d'Ailleboust de Manthet (1663–1709), Sieur de Coulonge, a French explorer who spent the winter of 1694–95 at the nearby Allumettes Island.

The Coulonge was used as a waterway by native North Americans and, later, by the coureurs des bois plying their independent trade in furs. In 1784, the North West Company built a fort at the mouth of the river, named Fort Coulonge, which passed into the hands of the Hudson's Bay Company when the two companies merged in 1821.

In 1835, Scottish-born lumber baron George Bryson acquired timber rights to thousands of acres of forest in the area, including the  immediately surrounding the Grandes Chutes.  In 1843, Bryson built a sawmill near the mouth of the river, which led to permanent settlement and the formation of the village of Fort-Coulonge. To transport the squared timber safely past the falls and the  gorge below, Bryson built a -long timber slide (a wooden chute flowing with water diverted from the head of the falls), which was replaced by a concrete chute in 1923.

For almost 150 years, the forests around the Coulonge were logged throughout the winter months until spring breakup permitted the massive log drives which, along with similar operations throughout the Ottawa River watershed, fueled the economy of the Ottawa Valley region from the early 19th century through the middle of the 20th.

The last spring log drive in Canada took place on the Coulonge River in 1982.  Since then, the timber from smaller-scale logging operations has been hauled out by trucks over a network of dirt roads which meander throughout the Coulonge River valley.

In 1994, a hydro-electric dam and power station was built at the head of the Grandes Chutes, leaving the Dumoine River as the last major free-flowing tributary of the Ottawa River.

References

External links

Rivers of Outaouais